Love X Stereo (Korean: 러브엑스테레오) is an electro duo from Seoul, Korea. Consisting lead vocalist and synthesizer player Annie Ko and guitarist and producer Toby Hwang, the duo debuted in 2011 by releasing an EP album called Buzzin'.

Band members
 Annie Ko: lead vocals, synthesizers
 Toby Hwang: producer, guitar, bass, synthesizers

History

1998-2011: 18Cruk and Skrew Attack 
In 1998, Toby Hwang, then-bassist for Korean punk rock band 18Cruk, decided to quit to from a new 3-piece band, Skrew Attack. Inspired by the faster-paced sounds of bands like NOFX, Black Flag, Bad Religion, and Minor Threat, Hwang cycled through numerous lineup changes with Skrew Attack before meeting vocalist Annie Ko in the Hongdae neighborhood in 2005. Ko had attended Ewha Womans University and Seoul National University (studying physics and astronomy, respectively), before pursuing a career as a singer. Hwang and Ko remained core members of Skrew Attack until 2011.

2011-present: Name change and Love X Stereo 
Driven by a desire to branch out from their punk rock beginnings, Hwang and Ko decided to change the band's name to Love X Stereo, a name derived from Hwang's record label Stereo City Records. In a 2013 interview with Schoolkids Records' BLURT Magazine, Hwang states: We did punk rock for years and years, so this time we wanted to do something different, something that isn’t necessarily punk rock, and something fresh and new. We love to add experimental flavor into our music, adding different elements from different genres that we like, such as trip hop, electro, alternative rock etc. So, changing band name was quite inevitable.Love X Stereo released their debut EP, Buzzin' on December 28, 2011, incorporating elements of electronic music not previously featured in Skrew Attack's music. Subsequent releases have continued to feature heavy use of synthesizers and drum machines, further developing their electro-rock sound.

Discography

LP

EP

V/A

International Festivals 
 Ubud Food Festival 2019 (Bali)
 Reeperbahn 2018 (Hamburg)
 APaMM (Asia Pacific Music Meeting) 2018 (Ulsan)
 Baybeats 2018 (Singapore)
 FOCUS Wales 2017 (Wrexham)
 Pentaport Rock Festival 2016 (Incheon)
 KCON (music festival) 2016 (Los Angeles)
 South by Southwest 2016 (Austin)
 Vans New Wave Musicfest 2015 (Bangalore)
 Mu:Con 2015 (Seoul)
 Zandari Festa 2015 (Seoul)
 Canadian Music Week 2015 (Toronto)
 CMJ Music Marathon 2014 (New York City)
 Culture Collide 2014 (Los Angeles, San Francisco)
 Hyundai Card CityBreak 2014 (Seoul)
 Ultra Music Festival 2014 (Seoul)
 Music Matters Live 2014 (Singapore)
 South by Southwest 2014 (Austin)
 CMJ Music Marathon 2013 (New York City)
 Indie Week Canada 2013 (Toronto)
 Zandari Festa 2012 (Seoul)
 Jisan Valley Rock Festival 2012 (Icheon)

Awards 
 2018 Best Music Video: Rage Is Not Enough (Canada International Film Festival)
 2017 Best Music Video: Nominee (Girona Film Festival)
 2017 Best Dance & Electronic Album of the Year: Nominee (Korean Music Awards)
 K-Rookies 2014 Annual Finals: Runner-Up (Korea Creative Content Agency)

External links 

 Official Website
 Facebook
 Twitter
 YouTube
 SoundCloud
 Instagram

References 

South Korean synthpop groups
South Korean musical duos
Male–female musical duos
Electronic music duos